Zhang Wei (born 2 February 1987) is a former Chinese badminton player. He was the men's doubles champion at the 2004 National Championships partnered with Sang Yang. He was selected to join the national junior team competed at the 2005 Asian Junior Championships in Jakarta, and won three silver medals. He then won the bronze medal in the senior level at the 2006 Asian Championships in the mixed doubles event partnered with Yu Yang. Zhang also won a silver and bronze medal at the 2007 Summer Universiade in the mixed team and men's doubles event.

Achievements

Asian Championships 
Men's doubles

Summer Universiade 
Men's doubles

Asian Junior Championships 
Boys' doubles

Mixed doubles

References

External links
 
 张尉 Zhang Wei at www.badmintoncn.com

1987 births
Living people
Sportspeople from Ningbo
Badminton players from Zhejiang
Chinese male badminton players
Universiade medalists in badminton
Universiade silver medalists for China
Universiade bronze medalists for China
Medalists at the 2007 Summer Universiade